"Choctaw Bingo" is a southern rock song written and performed by musician James McMurtry and appears on his album Saint Mary of the Woods and Live In Aught Three.  The song is an up beat, honky-tonk style narrative (ballad), having no chorus, but only alternating verse and instrumental sections. The tune is very similar to the verses in Chuck Berry's "You Can't Catch Me".

Lyrics 
The lyrics are told by a narrator to someone else, presumably his wife or, at least, the mother of his children.  The narrator starts the song by asking the other person to pack up their children and sedate them with vodka (or Vicodin, in one version) and, later, Benadryl.  Apparently, this is to keep them quiet on their trip to a family reunion taking place at a ranch belonging to the narrator's Uncle Slayton.  Each verse tells a different story about a different family member, though the tune still sounds the same.  The family members are...

Uncle Slayton:  The whole song revolves around Slayton and his lifestyle. Slayton is described as being too old to travel yet "still pretty spry."  He owns property near Lake Eufaula (where he caught a big blue catfish on a jug line) as well as a Holstein cow and an Airstream trailer.  The more we learn about Slayton, the more we are led to conclude that he is a gruff and shady character, adept at a variety of money-making activities that range from merely unethical to totally illegal.  It is explicitly stated that Slayton cooks crystal meth and makes moonshine. He owns a Browning Automatic Rifle. He sells parcels of his property to people with bad credit with the intention of reclaiming the land when they miss a payment.  It is hinted that a criminal past forced Slayton to leave Texas. Speculation about this story is implied to a favorite bit of family lore.  It is also hinted that Slayton's current wife is a mail order bride.   Slayton plays Choctaw Bingo every Friday night, which gives the song its title.

Cousin Roscoe:  Slayton's oldest son from his second marriage.  He was raised in East St. Louis, IL by his "momma's people," who "do things different," perhaps implying that his mother is African American, as is nearly the entire population of East St. Louis. Roscoe has nothing better to do than to just "Come on Down" so he sets off in a semi-trailer truck from the McDonald's on Will Rogers Turnpike headed for Dallas, TX.  He ends up in an accident with another driver who runs a stop light in Muskogee. It is not clear whether Roscoe was injured in the accident nor whether he will attend the reunion.

Bob and Mae:  Husband and wife couple whose status in the family is unknown.  Bob coaches a football team at a small town near Lake Texoma that won the 2A state championship the last two years, but will not repeat this year.  They purchase a cache of guns and ammunition in Tushka, Oklahoma on the way to Slayton's including an SKS rifle, military surplus ammunition available due to the changing political alignment of Eastern Europe, a Desert Eagle and some military surplus tracer bullets for Slayton's BAR.

Aunt Reeda: There is an extra verse that McMurtry sings, which is not heard in Saint Mary of the Woods or Live in Aught-Three, about a character called Aunt Reeda.

She's about the narrator's age and lives off of Interstate 44 somewhere in Missouri near a billboard advertising DNA testing for paternity. The narrator explains that she'd spent six months at Red River Rehab, because of a "pain pill problem" (possibly Oxycontin), but she's recovered and does cocaine now.

Ruth-Anne and Lynn: Sisters and second cousins to the narrator.  They live in Baxter Springs, Kansas which is described as "one hell-raisin'town".  The Loners MC run a biker bar, next to a lingerie store with big neon lips burning in the window.  The biker bar was actually a motorcycle parts store, Bikers Dream, which closed in 2001 and now houses Keystone Academy, while the lingerie shop, Romantic Delights, moved to Joplin, Missouri.  Bikers Dream was owned by Tim (Pony) Cline and the lingerie shop by his wife.

The narrator describes, in some detail, that he is incestuously attracted to his cousins, who wear hardly any clothes, which arouse him.  (James McMurtry calls this the "Good Part", and at live performances, encourages audiences to dance to it.)

The narrator references a bodark fence post in this section, which is one of the hardest woods in North America. The Bodark (Bois d’arc, or Osage orange) tree was used for fence posts for many years in some parts of the country due to its exceptionally hard, long lasting wood.

Legacy 

Choctaw Bingo is James McMurtry's most famous song. At live performances there is a section at the front of the stage where people dance.  When he plays this song the section is nearly packed and everyone is hopping around, hootin’ and hollerin’.

The song also appears on the soundtrack for the movie Beer for My Horses.

In 2009, American writer Ron Rosenbaum, writing for Slate, nominated Choctaw Bingo as a new national anthem for the United States.  Rosenbaum argues that the themes of the song are a perfect and prophetic metaphor for life in a post-financial crash America.

  "Choctaw Bingo" has been covered by Ray Wylie Hubbard on his album, Delirium Tremelos, 2005.
  A live version of this song appears on his latest album "Live in Europe" on a special bonus DVD

References 

American rock songs
2002 songs